Orgy is an American rock band formed in 1994, from Los Angeles, California. They have described their industrial rock music as "death pop". The band is best known for their cover version of the New Order song "Blue Monday", and the song "Stitches", both from their 1998 album Candyass.

History

Early years (1994–1997)
Orgy was formed in 1994 by vocalist Jay Gordon and guitarists Amir Derakh and Ryan Shuck. Bassist Paige Haley and drummer Bobby Hewitt soon completed the line-up. Derakh had previously gained some fame in the 1980s metal band Rough Cutt, and Hewitt was a former member of Electric Love Hogs. Gordon and Derakh were also experienced producers, having produced Coal Chamber's self-titled album.

In 1997, Jonathan Davis, who performed with Shuck in Sexart, signed Orgy as the first act on Korn's label, Elementree Records, which at the time had distribution with Reprise Records.

Candyass and Vapor Transmission (1998–2001)
In 1998, Orgy released their debut album, Candyass, the name inspired by a drag queen they had met. The album sold almost two million copies and produced two singles: a cover of the New Order song "Blue Monday", and "Stitches". Both charted on Total Request Live. The song "Revival" featured Jonathan Davis.

Orgy made their live debut at EdgeFest, an annual radio show in Tulsa, Oklahoma, in 1998. They also appeared on the Family Values Tour with Korn, Limp Bizkit, Ice Cube, Incubus, and Rammstein. They were featured on the live compilation album of the tour, released in 1999.  Other tours with Love and Rockets and Sugar Ray followed.

Their second album, the science fiction-themed Vapor Transmission, was released in 2000, with "Fiction (Dreams in Digital)" and "Opticon" as singles.

Side work and Punk Statik Paranoia (2001–2005)
In 2001, Orgy released the song "Faces" for the soundtrack of the film Zoolander. The band was a musical guest in the television series Charmed, performing "Opticon" in the episode "Sin Francisco".

In late 2003, guitarists Shuck and Derakh formed a side project, Julien-K, as an outlet for electronic material they had come up with during the writing process for Orgy. Jay Gordon also remixed the Linkin Park track "Points of Authority" for their album Reanimation, where it was renamed "Pts.of.Athrty".

After touring in support of Vapor Transmission, Orgy began working on a new album and a live DVD in mid to late 2002, but both of these were pushed back to mid 2003. Eventually, the band left Reprise Records and Elementree, taking the band's already recorded material with them. Explaining the split from the label in an interview to PopGurls.com:"We just couldn't get it together with them to get the record going and they weren't dropping us. So we finally managed to get let out of our contract and got the stuff that we had already recorded." -Amir Derakh  in 2003, Jay Gordon and his father, Lou, started his own independent record label, D1 Music, and the label finally released the band's third album, Punk Statik Paranoia, in February 2004. The long-awaited live DVD, Trans Global Spectacle, was released in August 2005.

Following touring in support of Punk Statik Paranoia, the band went on hiatus in late 2005.

Hiatus (2005–2012)
When asked for an Orgy update in late July 2008, Shuck informed fans that Orgy's return is still underway but their priority is getting the much delayed Julien-K album released. During a video interview at the annual Californian NAMM 2009 convention, Derakh mentioned a 2010 Orgy reunion.

Shuck and Derakh released their first album as Julien-K, titled Death to Analog, in March 2009. In the same year, they also released an album with Chester Bennington of Linkin Park under the name Dead by Sunrise.

On October 25, 2010, Ryan Shuck and Amir Derakh stated on the Julien-K blog: "As of Oct. 26th we will no longer be part of Orgy. Jay will continue making music without the original members."

On October 30, 2010, Jay Gordon released a statement via his official Facebook profile stating that he still owns the Orgy name and wants to continue forth creating new material for the band. Gordon wrote that all previous members of the band were too busy with numerous side projects to continue with the original band. "Everyone has been so busy with their different projects I figured this was the only way for me to continue on with the name. I started this band, and I don't want to let it fall to the wayside completely."

On November 7, 2011, Blabbermouth.net published a news story detailing the bitter feud between Gordon and guitarists Shuck and Derakh, that had spiraled out of control after Gordon revealed his plans to assemble a band of musicians and begin touring under the name Orgy.

Return with new lineup (2012–present)
On February 3, 2012, it was announced that Orgy would embark on a five-week run titled the Bad Blood Tour. Gordon was the only original member of Orgy appearing on this tour.

On August 4, 2012, Orgy linked to a 30-second demo of a new song, "Grime of the Century", via their Twitter and Facebook page. The song "Grime of the Century" was later made available on iTunes and the new Orgy website.

In 2013, Orgy embarked on the Wide Awake and Dead Tour with Vampires Everywhere! and Davey Suicide.

Orgy launched a crowdfunding campaign in August 2013 via Indiegogo.com with a $100,000 goal. Two months later, at the conclusion of the campaign, the band had only raised $8,739, falling 92% short of their goal.

On February 23, 2014, the band announced through their official website that the new single "Wide Awake and Dead" will be available through iTunes and Amazon on March 18, 2014. The "Wide Awake and Dead" video was filmed on April 22.

In 2015, they released their first collection of new music in 11 years, an EP titled Talk Sick. Originally, it was to be followed with another EP titled Entropy, but Gordon later told Westward Magazine the band would instead release it as a full-length album, that has yet to materialize.

Musical style
The band's sound has been described as alternative metal, nu metal, industrial rock, industrial metal, electronic rock, gothic rock, hard rock, and glam metal.

Band members

Current members
 Jay Gordon – lead vocals 
 Nic Speck – bass, backing vocals 
 Carlton Bost – lead guitar, backing vocals 
 Creighton Emrick – rhythm guitar, backing vocals 
 Márton Veress – drums 

Former members
 Ryan Shuck – rhythm guitar, backing vocals 
 Amir Derakh – lead guitar, synthesizers 
 Bobby Hewitt – drums 
 Paige Haley – bass 
 Ashburn Miller – rhythm guitar, synthesizers, keyboards 
 Jamie Miller – drums 
 Bobby Amaro – drums 

Live members
 Raanen Bozzio – drums 
 Ilia Yordanov – rhythm guitar 
 Ryan Browne – drums

Timeline

Related projects
 Julien-K – an electronic rock group founded by Derakh and Shuck in 2003. Their album Death to Analog was released on March 10, 2009.
 Dead by Sunrise – a band founded by Linkin Park's Chester Bennington, Amir Derakh, and Ryan Shuck
 Hellflower – a band founded by a longtime friend and Director of Activities Church, including Haley
 kill-o-watt – Gordon's new dubstep side project

Discography

Studio albums

EPs

Singles

Promotional singles

Music videos

Notes

A  "Opticon" did not enter the Billboard Hot 100, but peaked at number 56 on the Hot Singles Sales chart.

References

External links

 
1994 establishments in California
American alternative metal musical groups
American industrial metal musical groups
American electronic rock musical groups
Nu metal musical groups from California
Julien-K
Musical groups established in 1994
Musical groups from Los Angeles
Musical quintets
Reprise Records artists